Tarkas is a genus of the jumping spider family, Salticidae. The single described species, Tarkas maculatipes, is endemic to Mexico and Guatemala.

The genus is named after the character Tars Tarkas from the Edgar Rice Burroughs novel A Princess of Mars.

References

Salticidae
Monotypic Salticidae genera
Spiders of Mexico
Spiders of Central America